Sogndalsstranda or Sogndalstrand is a harbor village in Sokndal municipality in Rogaland county, Norway.

The village has about 280 residents and it has become a tourist destination since the 1990s. The old village has many wooden buildings and warehouses.  These buildings and the surrounding area were protected by law in 2005. Locally, the area is also known as simply Strondo.

History
The village grew up starting in the 1600s and by the 1660s, there was a beach resort located in Sogndalstrand.  The villages of Sogndalstrand and Rekefjord are located near each other along the coast, and together they were granted  rights in 1798.  Together this ladested was called Sogndal (historically spelled "Soggendahl").  This status gave them a monopoly on import and export of goods and materials in the port and in the surrounding district. On 1 January 1838, all of Norway was divided up into municipalities according to the formannskapsdistrikt law.

The ladested of Sogndal was put into the municipality of Sokndal.  In 1845, the ladested was separated from Sokndal became a municipality of its own called Sogndal. Initially, Sogndal ladested had a population of 348 while Sokndal municipality had a population of 2,819. On 1 July 1944, Sogndal was reunited with Sokndal municipality, losing its small seaport status. Prior to the merger Sogndal had a population of 311.

References

Villages in Rogaland
Sokndal